Mary Ann Augustin  (born 16 April 1954, Kedah, Malaysia) is an Australian food chemist and dairy scientist who leads the Food Science Research Program at CSIRO.  Much of her work has focused on understanding the changes that occur during dairy milk processing and the effect these changes exhibit on the proteins and minerals of milk, which are collectively referred to as "milk functionality".

Dr. Augustin researches emerging food processing technologies and approaches to food processing for dairy and milk products, fish oils and probiotics. She leads the research on CSIRO's patented microencapsulation system, a high-tech ingredient-delivery technology. Her research on the chemistry of milk modifications has led to the development of specialised milk powders that improve the performance of liquid milk products as food ingredients. The most extensively used of Dr Augustin's innovations is a technology that allows milk powder manufacturers to guarantee that their product will be stable during subsequent processing in the manufacture of recombined products. Notably, she was also the driving force behind the research that produced calcium-enriched milk, enabling adults to ingest their recommended daily calcium intake from fewer than two glasses of the fortified milk.

Augustin graduated with a Bachelor of Science degree with First Class Honours from Monash University, where she was also awarded her PhD. In 1988, she joined CSIRO laboratories and is now heads the Food Science Research Program at CSIRO Food and Nutritional Services. She was appointed as a Professional Fellow in the School of Chemistry at Monash University in 2005 as part of a special collaboration between CSIRO and Monash University. She is a member of the Australian Academy of Science National Committee for Nutrition, serves on the Research Advisory Committee for the Malaysian Palm Oil Board in China, and in 2013 was elected a Fellow of the Australian Academy of Technological Sciences and Engineering (FTSE).

Selected publications 
2014 Fu S, Shen Z, Ajlouni S, Ng K, Sanguansri L, Augustin MA. Interactions of buttermilk with curcuminoids. Food Chem. Apr 15;149:47-53. 
2014 Oliver CM, Mawson R, Melton LD, Dumsday G, Welch J, Sanguansri P, Singh TK, Augustin MA. Sequential low and medium frequency ultrasound assists biodegradation of wheat chaff by white rot fungal enzymes. Carbohydr Polym. Oct 13;111:183-90. 
2013 Sanguansri L1, Shen Z, Weerakkody R, Barnes M, Lockett T, Augustin MA. Omega-3 fatty acids in ileal effluent after consuming different foods containing microencapsulated fish oil powder - an ileostomy study. Food Funct. Jan;4(1):74-82.  
2013 Sanguansri L, Day L, Shen Z, Fagan P, Weerakkody R, Cheng LJ, Rusli J, Augustin MA. Encapsulation of mixtures of tuna oil, tributyrin and resveratrol in a spray dried powder formulation. Food Funct. Dec;4(12):1794-802. 
2013 Sanguansri L, Shen Z, Weerakkody R, Barnes M, Lockett T, Augustin MA. Omega-3 fatty acids in ileal effluent after consuming different foods containing microencapsulated fish oil powder - an ileostomy study. Food Funct. 2013 Jan;4(1):74-82. 
2010 Chandrapala J,  McKinnon I, Augustin MA, Udabage P. The influence of milk composition on pH and calcium activity measured in situ during heat treatment of reconstituted skim milk. Journal of Dairy Research. 77: 257–264. 
2010 Ying DY, Phoon MC, Sanguansri L, Weerakkody R, Burgar MI, Augustin MA. Microencapsulated Lactobacillus Rhamnosus GG Powders: Relationship of Powder Physical Properties to Probiotic Survival During Storage. Journal of Food Science. 75(9): E588-E595 
2010 Shen ZP, Augustin MA, Sanguansri L, Cheng LJ. Oxidative stability of microencapsulated fish oil powders stabilized by blends of chitosan, modified starch and glucose. Journal of Agricultural and Food Chemistry. 58 (7): 4487–4493. 
2009 Oliver CM, Augustin MA, Sanguansri L. Maillard-based casein-carbohydrate microcapsules for the delivery of fish oil. Australian Journal of Dairy Technology. 64(1): 80-83. 
2009 Augustin MA, Sanguansri P. Nanostructured materials in the food industry. Adv Food Nutr Res. vol 58:183-213.  Review. 
2009 McKinnon IR, Yap SE, Augustin MA, Hemar Y. Diffusing-wave spectroscopy investigation of heated skim milks containing calcium chloride. Food Hydrocolloids. 23: 1127–1133. 
2009 Augustin MA1, Hemar Y. Nano- and micro-structured assemblies for encapsulation of food ingredients. Chem Soc Rev. Apr;38(4):902-12. 
2007 Augustin MA1, Udabage P. Influence of processing on functionality of milk and dairy proteins. Adv Food Nutr Res. vol 53:1-38 
2006 Crittenden R, Weerakkody R, Sanguansri L, Augustin M. Synbiotic microcapsules that enhance microbial viability during nonrefrigerated storage and gastrointestinal transit. Appl Environ Microbiol. Mar;72(3):2280-2.  
2001 Udabage P, McKinnon IR, Augustin MA. Effects of mineral salts and calcium chelating agents on the gelation of renneted skim milk. J Dairy Sci. Jul;84(7):1569-75. 
2000 Udabage P, McKinnon IR, Augustin MA. Mineral and casein equilibria in milk: effects of added salts and calcium-chelating agents. J Dairy Res.  Aug;67(3):361-70. 
1996 Ward BR, Goddard SJ, Augustin MA, McKinnon IR. Distribution of proteins in concentrated skim milk reconstituted from low- and high-heat milk powders. J Dairy Res. Nov;63(4):643-8.

Patents 
Ashokkumar M, Kentish S, Lee J U-L, Zisu B, Palmer M and Augustin M. Processing Dairy Ingredients. WO2009079691.
Sanguansri P, Augustin MA and Htoon A. Starch Treatment Process. WO2005105851.
Sanguansri L, Augustin MA and Crittenden R. Probiotic Storage and Delivery. WO2005030229.
Augustin MA, Sanguansri L and Head R. Gastro-intestinal Tract Delivery Systems. WO2005048998.
Sanguansri L and Augustin MA. Encapsulation of Food Ingredients. WO200174175.
Augustin MA and Williams R. Nutritional Mineral Fortification of Milk. WO200172135 A1.

Awards 
2008 Newton Turner Award for outstanding scientists at CSIRO
2003 American Oil Chemists Society Corporate Achievement Award (team award)
2001 Recognised by Women In Business (Commonwealth of Australia)
2001 JR Vickery Address (Australian Institute of Food Science and Technology)
1998 Sir Ian McLennan Achievement For Industry Award
1997 Loftus-Hills Silver Medal (Dairy Industry Association Of Australia)

References

External links 
 CSIRO brief Bio
 AIM Conference Bio

Australian women scientists
Scientists from Melbourne
Living people
Fellows of the Australian Academy of Technological Sciences and Engineering
1954 births
Malaysian emigrants to Australia